Tulcus is a genus of longhorn beetles of the subfamily Lamiinae, containing the following species:

 Tulcus amazonicus (Thomson, 1860)
 Tulcus crudus (Erichson, 1847)
 Tulcus diaphorus Martins & Galileo, 2009
 Tulcus dimidiatus (Bates, 1865)
 Tulcus distinctus (Dillon & Dillon, 1945)
 Tulcus fulvofasciatus (Dillon & Dillon, 1945)
 Tulcus hebes (Dillon & Dillon, 1945)
 Tulcus litura (Dillon & Dillon, 1945)
 Tulcus lycimnia (Dillon & Dillon, 1945)
 Tulcus obliquefasciatus (Dillon & Dillon, 1952)
 Tulcus paganus (Pascoe, 1859)
 Tulcus pallidus (Dillon & Dillon, 1945)
 Tulcus pepoatus (Martins & Galileo, 1996)
 Tulcus picticorne (Bates, 1865)
 Tulcus piger (Martins & Galileo, 1990)
 Tulcus pullus (Dillon & Dillon, 1945)
 Tulcus signaticorne (Thomson, 1868)
 Tulcus soma (Dillon & Dillon, 1945)
 Tulcus subfasciatus (Thomson, 1860)
 Tulcus thysbe (Dillon & Dillon, 1945)
 Tulcus tigrinatus (Thomson, 1868)

References

 
Onciderini